The 1978 Egyptian Open was a men's tennis tournament played on outdoor clay courts that was part of the 1978 Colgate-Palmolive Grand Prix . It was played at Cairo in Egypt and was held from 6 March until 12 March 1978. First-seeded José Higueras won the singles title.

Finals

Singles
 José Higueras defeated  Kjell Johansson 4–6, 6–4, 6–4
 It was Higueras' 1st singles title of the year and the 3rd of his career.

Doubles
 Ismail El Shafei /  Brian Fairlie defeated  Lito Alvarez /  George Hardie 6–3, 7–5, 6–2

References

External links
 ITF tournament edition details

Cairo Open
Cairo Open
1978 in Egyptian sport